The 2003 La Flèche Wallonne was the 67th edition of La Flèche Wallonne cycle race and was held on 23 April 2003. The race started in Charleroi and finished in Huy. The race was won by Igor Astarloa of the Saeco team.

General classification

References

2003 in road cycling
2003
2003 in Belgian sport